The Kishwaukee River Conference (KRC) is an organization of six high schools in northern Illinois. These high schools are members of the Illinois High School Association.

The high schools of the Kishwaukee River Conference are located in McHenry County.

History 
On November 8, 2013, it was announced that Woodstock and Woodstock North planned to leave the Fox Valley Conference by 2015 and create a new conference. After rumors that members of the Big Northern Conference's East Division might join this new conference, it was announced on November 19 that five BNC members - Burlington Central, Genoa-Kingston, Harvard, Johnsburg (which at the time was still in the Fox Valley Conference but was joining the BNC as the start of the 2014–15 school year), Marengo, and Richmond-Burton were invited to join the new conference, creating a proposed 8-team conference. The next day, it was announced that the name for this new conference will be the Kishwaukee River Conference. In February 2014, it was reported that Harvard and Genoa-Kingston had decided to remain in the BNC, while Richmond-Burton and Johnsburg remained undecided; Harvard later announced that they would, in fact, leave the BNC for the KRC, with the first season of the KRC to be during the 2016–17 school year. In June 2014, Richmond-Burton and Johnsburg both voted to officially become charter members of the KRC in 2016.

On July 19, 2017, the KRC voted 5-1 to remove Burlington Central from the conference, effective following the 2018–19 school year. Burlington Central will join the Fox Valley Conference starting in the 2019–20 school year.

In 2021, the KRC entered into a football partnership with the Interstate Eight Conference.  The partnership creates two divisions for football, one consisting of the 7 smallest schools across the two conferences and one consisting of the 7 largest schools.  In the 2021–22 season, the "Blue" division will include Harvard, Johnsburg, Marengo, and Richmond-Burton, while the "White" division will include Woodstock and Woodstock North.

In 2022, Sandwich High School and Plano High School pledged to join the Kishwaukee River Conference, starting in the 2023-24 season, leaving the Interstate 8.

Membership 
The conference's current members, as of 2021–22:

Previous Members

Future Members

Membership Timeline

State championships 
Three IHSA State Championships have been earned by members of the KRC.

Football 

 Richmond-Burton
 2019–20 4A

Competitive Cheerleading 

 Johnsburg
 2021–22 S

Softball 

 Marengo
 2016–17 3A

Notes

References

External links
 Illinois High School Association, Official Site

High school sports conferences and leagues in the United States
Illinois high school sports conferences
High school sports in Illinois